Convent & Stuart Hall is a partnership of two gender specific Catholic high schools in the city of San Francisco: Convent of the Sacred Heart High School, a girls’ school located at 2222 Broadway and Stuart Hall High School, a boys’ high school located at 1715 Octavia Street. The schools also operate under the name of Schools of the Sacred Heart, San Francisco. The unique partnership allows both schools to operate single-sex classes in a coeducational environment. The schools were founded by the Schools of the Sacred Heart, a local organization that traces its lineage to 1887.

References

Catholic secondary schools in California
Educational institutions established in 1887
High schools in San Francisco
Sacred Heart schools in the United States
1887 establishments in California